Helene Egelund (born 15 February 1965) is a Danish actress. She has appeared in more than thirty films since 1986.

Selected filmography

References

External links 

1965 births
Living people
Danish film actresses